The Island is a 2005 American dystopian science fiction action thriller film directed and co-produced by Michael Bay from a story by Caspian Tredwell-Owen. It stars Ewan McGregor, Scarlett Johansson, Djimon Hounsou, Sean Bean, Michael Clarke Duncan, and Steve Buscemi. The film is about Lincoln Six Echo (McGregor), who struggles to fit into the highly structured world in which he lives, isolated in a compound, and the series of events that unfold when he questions how truthful that world is. After Lincoln learns the compound inhabitants are clones used for organ harvesting as well as surrogates for wealthy people in the outside world, he attempts to escape with Jordan Two Delta (Johansson) and expose the illegal cloning movement.

The Island has been described as a pastiche of "escape-from-dystopia" science fiction films of the 1960s and 1970s, such as Fahrenheit 451, THX 1138, Parts: The Clonus Horror, and Logan's Run.  The Island cost $126 million to produce. The original score was composed by Steve Jablonsky, who went on to score Bay's further works. It opened on July 22, 2005 by DreamWorks Pictures in North America and internationally by Warner Bros. Pictures, to mixed reviews, earning $36 million at the United States box office and $127 million overseas for a $162 million worldwide total.

Plot
On July 19, 2019, Lincoln Six Echo and Jordan Two Delta live with others in an isolated compound. This dystopian community is governed by a strict set of rules. The residents are told that the outside world has become too contaminated to support life with the exception of a pathogen-free island. Each week, one resident gets to leave the compound and live on the island by way of a lottery.

Lincoln begins having dreams that he knows are not from his own experiences. Dr. Merrick, a scientist who runs the compound, is concerned and places probes in Lincoln's body to monitor his cerebral activity. While secretly visiting an off-limits power facility in the basement where technician James McCord works, Lincoln discovers a live moth in a ventilation shaft, leading him to deduce the outside world is not really contaminated. Lincoln follows the moth to another section, where he discovers the "lottery" is actually a system to selectively remove inhabitants from the compound, where the "winner" is then used for organ harvesting, surrogate pregnancies, and other important purposes for each one's wealthy sponsor, of whom they are clones.

Merrick learns Lincoln has discovered the truth about his existence, which forces Lincoln to escape. Meanwhile, Jordan has been selected for the island. Lincoln and Jordan escape the facility and emerge in the desert. Lincoln explains the truth to her, and they set out to discover the real world. Merrick hires Burkinabé mercenary and former GIGN operative Albert Laurent to find and return them to the compound.

Lincoln and Jordan find McCord, who explains that all the facility residents are clones of wealthy sponsors and are kept ignorant about the real world and conditioned to never question their environment or history. McCord provides the name of Lincoln's sponsor, yacht designer Tom Lincoln, in Los Angeles and helps them to the Yucca maglev station, where they board an Amtrak train to LA before mercenaries kill him. In New York City, Jordan's sponsor, supermodel Sarah Jordan, is comatose following a car crash and requires transplants from Jordan to survive. Lincoln also meets Tom, who gives him some explanation about the cloning institute, causing Lincoln to realize that he has gained Tom's memories. Tom seemingly agrees to help Lincoln and Jordan reveal Merrick's crimes to the public, but secretly betrays them to Merrick and Laurent, as he desperately needs Lincoln's liver to survive his cirrhosis. Tricking Lincoln into leaving with him, Tom brings him to an ambush that results in a car chase through suburban LA and ends with Lincoln tricking Laurent into believing Tom is the clone and killing him, allowing him to assume Tom's identity. Returning to Tom's home, Lincoln and Jordan give in to their romantic urges and have sex.

Merrick surmises that a cloning defect was responsible for Lincoln's memories and behavior, resulting in him and every future clone generation to question their environment and even tap into their sponsor's memories. To prevent this, he decides to eliminate the four latest generations of clones. Lincoln and Jordan, however, plan to liberate the other clones. Posing as Tom, Lincoln returns to the compound to destroy the holographic projectors that conceal the outside world. Jordan allows herself to be caught to assist Lincoln's plan. Laurent, who has moral qualms about the clones' treatment after witnessing their fight for survival and learning that Sarah Jordan may not survive even with the organ transplants, helps Jordan. Lincoln kills Merrick with a harpoon gun, and the clones are freed, seeing the outside world for the first time. As Laurent seemingly gives up his mercenary life, Lincoln and Jordan sail away in one of Tom's boats together toward an island, fulfilling their dream of one day going to such a place.

Cast

Production

Pre-production
In the original script written by Caspian Tredwell-Owen, at the time known for his work on the 2003 film Beyond Borders, the story was set one hundred years in the future and Scarlett Johansson's character Jordan Two Delta was originally named Ester and was meant to be pregnant. After DreamWorks Pictures acquired the rights to the script, it was then re-written by writing duo Alex Kurtzman and Roberto Orci, at the time mostly known for their work on the television shows Hercules: The Legendary Journeys, Xena: Warrior Princess and Alias, mostly to decrease the budget. Kurtzman and Orci also heavily re-wrote the second and third acts of the film and included the scene of Ewan McGregor's character Lincoln Six Echo finding a butterfly.

DreamWorks executives Steven Spielberg, Walter F. Parkes and Laurie MacDonald chose Michael Bay to direct the film, having been impressed with his work.

The Island was the first of many collaborations between Spielberg, Bay, Kurtzman and Orci. Bay later directed the first five films of the live-action Transformers film series, which Spielberg executive produced, as well as producing Bumblebee and Transformers: Rise of the Beasts. And Kurtzman and Orci later wrote The Legend of Zorro, the first two live-action Transformers films and Cowboys & Aliens, all executive produced by Spielberg and produced the 2008 film Eagle Eye alongside Spielberg.

Filming

Principal photography for The Island began on October 24, 2004. The ruined buildings where Jordan and Lincoln sleep after leaving the subterranean compound are in Rhyolite, Nevada.  The city parts were shot in Detroit, Michigan, with Michigan Central Station one of the notable locations. Other portions of the film were shot in the Coachella Valley, California.

Release

Box office
The Island grossed $12,409,070 in over 3,100 theaters its opening weekend in fourth place behind Charlie and the Chocolate Factory, Wedding Crashers and Fantastic Four. The film went on to gross $35,818,913 domestically and $127,130,251 in other markets, for a worldwide total of $162,949,164.

Ultimately, it was considered a box office bomb, which Edward Jay Epstein of Slate blamed on poor publicity. Epstein notes that research polls showed little awareness of The Island's impending release amongst its target audience and that trailers bore little relation to the film's plot. He writes, "What really failed here was not the directing, acting, or story (which were all acceptable for a summer movie) but the marketing campaign."

Critical reception
The Island drew mixed reviews from critics. On Rotten Tomatoes, the film has an approval rating of 39% based on reviews from 201 critics, with an average rating of 5.40/10. The website's consensus reads, "A clone of THX 1138, Coma, and Logan's Run, The Island is another loud and bombastic Michael Bay movie where explosions and chases matter more than characters, dialogue, or plot." On Metacritic, the film received "mixed or average reviews," with a weighted average of 50 out of 100 based on 38 critics. Audiences polled by CinemaScore gave the film an average grade of "B" on an A+ to F scale.

Chicago Sun-Times Roger Ebert said, "[the first half] is a spare, creepy science fiction parable, and then it shifts into a high-tech action picture. Both halves work. Whether they work together is a good question." Ebert gave the film three out of four stars and praised the performances of the actors, in particular Michael Clarke Duncan: "[He] has only three or four scenes, but they're of central importance, and he brings true horror to them." On the critical side, he said the film "never satisfactorily comes full circle" and missed the opportunity "to do what the best science fiction does, and use the future as a way to critique the present."

Variety's Justin Chang called the film an "exercise in sensory overkill" and said that Bay took on "the weighty moral conundrums of human cloning, resolving them in a storm of bullets, car chases and more explosions than you can shake a syringe at." He noted McGregor and Buscemi as highlights of the film, along with Nigel Phelps' production design. Chang felt the story lacked in surprises and blamed "attention-deficit editing by Paul Rubell and Christian Wagner" for action sequences that he thought lacked tension and were "joltingly repetitive".

Salon's Stephanie Zacharek also praised the actors but felt that when the film "[gets] really interesting, Bay thinks he needs to throw in a car crash or a round of gunfire to keep our attention." She felt the film had enough surprises "to make you wish it were better." A.O. Scott of The New York Times''' said "[the] film is smarter than you might expect, and at the same time dumber than it could be."

Reviewers were critical of the excessive product placement in the film.

Copyright infringement lawsuit

The creators of the 1979 film Parts: The Clonus Horror, which was also about a colony that breeds clones to harvest organs for the elite, filed a copyright infringement suit in 2005. DreamWorks attempted to have the suit dismissed but a federal judge determined that there was indeed a copyright infringement case to be heard and scheduled the case to go to trial in February 2007. However, DreamWorks then settled the case out of court in late 2006 for an undisclosed seven-figure sum.

Michael Marshall Smith's 1996 novel Spares, in which the hero liberates intelligent clones from a "spare farm", was optioned by DreamWorks in the late 1990s, but was never made. It remains unclear if the story inspired The Island'', and so Marshall Smith did not consider it worthwhile to pursue legal action over the similarities.

References

External links

 
 

2005 films
2005 action thriller films
2005 science fiction action films
2000s chase films
2000s dystopian films
2000s English-language films
2000s science fiction thriller films
American chase films
American dystopian films
DreamWorks Pictures films
Films about cloning
Films about identity theft
Films about organ transplantation
Films directed by Michael Bay
Films involved in plagiarism controversies
Films produced by Michael Bay
Films produced by Ian Bryce
Films produced by Walter F. Parkes
Films scored by Steve Jablonsky
Films set in 2019
Films set in Los Angeles
Films set in the future
Films set on fictional islands
Films shot in California
Films shot in Detroit
Films shot in Nevada
Films with screenplays by Alex Kurtzman and Roberto Orci
Warner Bros. films
2000s American films